David "Beno" Benveniste is an American entrepreneur from Beverly Hills, California. He is CEO of Velvet Hammer Music and Management Group, which represents Grammy Award-winning and nominated artists that includes; System Of A Down, Korn, Deftones, AFI, Avenged Sevenfold, Alice in Chains, and more. VHMGMT also has a publishing branch and record label, to which OneRepublic was signed. 

Beno has also amassed a prolific collection of street art and pop art, and is a luxury real estate investor.

Early life and education
Beno attended Beverly Hills High School and graduated from Annenberg School of Communication and Journalism at the University of Southern California.

As alma mater, Beno continues to give back to USC by speaking to students and challenging them to think beyond the current music industry business models. "When it comes to guest speakers at USC Thornton's Music Industry program, Beno is definitely a headliner", offers chairman of the Music Industry Program, Michael K. Garcia.

Career
In 1996, after seeing System Of A Down (SOAD) perform at a rehearsal in North Hollywood, Beno gradually took over managerial duties for the band. Through his use of emerging online marketing techniques, management and free online distribution, he helped propel System Of A Down to worldwide success.

In 1997, Beno founded Velvet Hammer Music and Management Group. Velvet Hammer also went on to include a publishing branch and record label, to which OneRepublic was signed. 

In addition to being recognized as one of rock music’s elite managers, Beno is also hyperactive in the luxury real estate industry. In 2013, The Wall Street Journal covered the sale of one of his Beverly Hills properties for $7.425 million.

StreetWise
Around the same time that Velvet Hammer was founded, Beno also founded digital marketing agency, StreetWise Concepts & Culture, which utilized social media marketing, interactive marketing and word-of-mouth marketing to connect brands with emerging trends in youth culture. As the Recording Industry Association of America (RIAA) began filing hundreds of subpoenas for file sharing violations, Beno continued to share free music with fans both through physical mail and via the internet. "The first 100,000 albums are always the hardest to sell, and that's the expertise Beno provides", Rick Rubin was quoted as telling Time magazine.

Clients included ABC, Activision, Coca-Cola, Cold Stone Creamery, Electronic Arts, Fuel TV, Live Nation, Nielsen Entertainment, Nokia, Paramount Pictures, Subway, Ubisoft, Urban+Decay Cosmetics, Walt Disney Pictures, and Warner Brothers.

Awards

"Beno"
 RIAA Commemorative Award for certified Platinum Sales of the Capitol Records compact disk and cassette "Kid A" and "Amnesiac" by Radiohead.
 RIAA Commemorative Award for certified Gold® Sales of more than 500,000 copies of the Virgin Records release of "Black Gives Way to Blue" by Alice in Chains.

Velvet Hammer
 RIAA Commemorative Award for sales of more than 1,000,000 copies of the Maverick Records album "Around the Fur" by Deftones.
 Sony/ATV and Velvet Hammer Music collaborated to publish the ASCAP award-winning song "Apologize" by OneRepublic.
 RIAA Commemorative Award for the certified combined worldwide sales of more than 5,000,000 of the American Recordings/Columbia Records release of "Toxicity" by System of a Down.
 RIAA Commemorative Award for the certified sales of more than 1,000,000 copies of the American Recordings/Columbia Records release of "Steal This Album!"

Streetwise
 RIAA Commemorative Award for the certified sales of more than 10,000,000 copies of the La Face/Arista release of "Speakerboxxx/The Love Below" by Outkast.
 2010 Communication Arts: Pick of the Day for Tony Hawk: Ride Website.
 2009 American Design Awards: Monthly Design Contest Winner for Tony Hawk: Ride® Website.
 2009 Interactive Media Awards: Best in Class – Gaming for Guitar Hero: Aerosmith Website, as well as Best in Class – Gaming for Madagascar: Escape 2 Africa the Video Game Website.
 2008 Davey Awards: Gold Award Winner for Guitar Hero: Aerosmith Website.
 2008 Webby Awards: Official honoree for Call of Duty 4: Modern Warfare Online Community.
 2008 MI6 Awards: Most Clickable Website for a Product and Most Effective Attention Getters for Call of Duty 4.
 2008 American Business Awards: Stevie Award Finalist for I Am Legend Movie Website.
 2007 Interactive Media Awards: Best in Class – Movie/Film for I Am Legend Movie Website.
 2007 Summit International Awards: Leader in Emerging Media for CharlieOscarDelta.com (Call of Duty Website).
 2007 Interactive Media Awards: Outstanding Achievement – Marketing for CharlieOscarDelta.com (Call of Duty Website).
 2006 DFWIMA – EIMA Awards: Most Effective Marketing Program for Nokia Xpress Audio Messaging.

References

External links
 Velvet Hammer official site

Living people
1970 births
American chief executives
USC Annenberg School for Communication and Journalism alumni